Chambercombe is a hilly suburb in the North Devon town of Ilfracombe.

References

External links

Villages in Devon
Ilfracombe